Goianésia do Pará is a municipality, and municipal seat in the state of Pará, Brazil. In 2020 the population was 41,081. The municipal area is 7,024 km2. The city of Goianésia do Pará is approximately 103 m above sea level.

References

External links
for demographics and statistics 

Municipalities in Pará